The WWE Women's Championship was a women's professional wrestling world championship in the World Wrestling Federation (WWF, now WWE). The lineage of the Women's Championship dates back to September 18, 1956, when The Fabulous Moolah became the NWA World Women's Champion. WWE did not exist at that time, and although they did not create their own women's championship until 1984 with The Fabulous Moolah as the first WWF Women's Champion, they claim 1956 for the championship's establishment and do not recognize any title changes from when Moolah became champion in 1956 until she lost it in 1984. This made the Women's Championship the oldest active professional wrestling championship in WWE history until its retirement in 2010 after unification with the WWE Divas Championship. The final champion was Layla.

A new WWE Women's Championship (now Raw Women's Championship) was created in 2016, and although both championships had shared the name and the original is considered to be the predecessor, the new championship does not carry the lineage of the original.

History

On September 18, 1956, The Fabulous Moolah became the third NWA World Women's Champion. At that time, the WWE did not exist and did not become a company until 1963, when it was established as the World Wide Wrestling Federation (WWWF). Moolah, who bought the rights to the championship in the 1970s, defended the championship as the NWA World Women's Champion up until May 19, 1984; by this time, the WWWF had been renamed to World Wrestling Federation (WWF). In 1983, the WWF disaffiliated with the NWA and Moolah sold the championship's rights to the WWF in 1984, and she was recognized as the WWF Women's Champion. Instead of beginning her reign in 1984, the WWF claimed the lineage of her reign from when she first became champion in 1956. The preceding champions and the title changes between 1956 and when Moolah lost it in 1984 are not recognized by WWE (although they are recognized by the NWA). As a result, The Fabulous Moolah's first reign is considered to have lasted 28 years by the promotion.

In 1990, the Women's Championship became inactive after Rockin' Robin vacated the championship following her departure from the WWF. Then in December 1993, the title was reactivated with Alundra Blayze winning a tournament for the vacant Women's Championship. However, the Women's Championship became inactive again when Blayze was released from the WWF. Blayze, as Madusa, unexpectedly signed with World Championship Wrestling in 1995 and threw the championship belt, which was still in her possession, in a trash can on an episode of WCW Monday Nitro (in Blayze's 2015 WWE Hall of Fame speech, she "returned" the title). The Women's Championship was reactivated again in September 1998 during the Attitude Era when Jacqueline Moore defeated Sable to win the title.

After the WWF/WWE name change in 2002, the championship was subsequently referred to as the WWE Women's Championship. With the WWE Brand Extension in March 2002, the Women's Championship at first was still defended on both the Raw and SmackDown brands, while most titles were exclusive to one brand. In September, the Women's Championship became exclusive to only the Raw brand. The Women's Championship remained the sole championship contested by women, until July 4, 2008, when a counterpart to the championship, called the WWE Divas Championship, was created for the SmackDown brand. On April 13, 2009, the Women's Championship became exclusive to the SmackDown brand when reigning champion Melina was drafted from Raw to SmackDown during the 2009 WWE Draft to replace the current WWE Divas Champion Maryse, who had been drafted to Raw.

The Women's Championship was unified with the Divas Championship at Night of Champions in September 2010, creating the Unified WWE Divas Championship and making the Women's Championship defunct as the unified title followed the lineage of the Divas Championship; the title eventually dropped the "Unified" moniker.

On April 3, 2016, at WrestleMania 32, a new WWE Women's Championship (now called the Raw Women's Championship) was introduced to succeed the Divas Championship. This new title does not carry the lineage of either the Divas Championship or the original Women's Championship, but is acknowledged by WWE as the successor of both.

Tournaments

WWF Women's Championship Tournament (1993)
The WWF Women's Championship Tournament was a tournament to decide the new WWF Women's Champion after the title was reinstated after three years of inactivity.

WWE Women's Championship Tournament (2006)
The WWE Women's Championship Tournament was a tournament to crown a new WWE Women's Champion after champion Trish Stratus retired from her wrestling career. The first round started on September 25, 2006, and ended at Cyber Sunday when Lita, who Stratus defeated in her retirement match, defeated Mickie James.
 Melina defeated Wilson in a Lumberjill match.
 Maria defeated Candice, Victoria and Wilson in Bra and Panties Match.
 The final match between Lita and James was a Lumberjill match.

Brand designation history 
Following the WWE brand extension on March 25, all titles in WWE became exclusive to either the Raw brand or SmackDown brand. The following is a list of dates indicating the transitions of the Women's Championship between the Raw and SmackDown brands.

Reigns

As per WWE's official title history, the inaugural champion was The Fabulous Moolah, who defeated Judy Grable on September 18, 1956 Moolah had the longest reign by holding it for 10 years, although the WWE considers it to be longer at 28 years, as title changes between 1956 and 1984 are not recognized by the promotion. The Fabulous Moolah is technically tied with Trish Stratus for the most reigns with 7, but because the WWE does not recognize the title changes between 1956 and 1984, Moolah only has 4 and Trish has the most reigns with 7. Mickie James has the shortest reign with 1 hour. While in Paris on April 24, 2007, James defeated then-champion Melina and Victoria in a Triple Threat Match. However, Jonathan Coachman, the Acting General Manager for Raw, said that since Mickie pinned Victoria, Melina deserved an immediate rematch, which she won.

The only male Women's Champion was Harvey Wippleman. On January 31, 2000, Wippleman won the WWF Women's Championship from The Kat while he was in a disguise and used the name "Hervina" in a "Lumberjill Snow bunny" match; the match took place in a snow filled pool surrounded by female wrestlers whose purpose was to keep the competitors from leaving the pool.

The women's division was deemed inactive in 1990 during Rockin’ Robin's reign. Alundra Blayze won the Women's Championship after it was reactivated in 1993. Chyna departed from the company during her reign. Trish Stratus won her seventh title reign in her final match at Unforgiven in 2006 against Lita before retiring the same night, thus vacating the championship the next day. Michelle McCool unified the Women's and Divas Championships in Layla's place, thus leaving Layla the final and undefeated champion.

References 
Notes

Footnotes

External links 
 Official WWE Women's Title History
 Wrestling-Titles.com: WWE Women's Championship
 WWE Women's Title History

WWE women's championships